Medusinites is a genus of disc shaped fossilised organisms associated with the Ediacaran biota. They have been found in rocks dated to be 580 to 541 million years old.

Biology 
Only three distinct species of Medusinites are known. They are similar to Protolyella in form and have an inner and outer ring.  Specimens are typically 1–5 cm in diameter and the radius of its central disc is smaller than the width of the outer ring. They also have radial furrows and concentric circle features, but those details are not always preserved. They have been described as possibly living a lifestyle similar to a "stationary intermediate-level epifaunal osmotroph".

Distribution 
Medusinites species have been found in Australia, Canada, Norway, India, and Algeria. They are often found in sandstone and quartzite.

Classification 
Medusinites are in the Phylum Cnidaria, which means they are related to other genera such as Aspidella and Cloudinidae, and are essentially classified as eumetazoans, just like modern jellyfish. However, there have been several differing theories over the years about the placement of Medusinites, as well as the Ediacaran biota as a whole, and how many species there are within the genus. Several species within Medusinites have been moved to other genera or absorbed into other existing species, such as M. patellaris, which was found to be a junior holotype for an Aspidella sp., and M. mawsoni, which was assimilated into M. asteroides. Regarding the debate over the nature of disc shaped Ediacaran fossils like Medusinites, there are two main opposing points of view. A. Seilacher views the theory of them being soft bodied and jellyfish-like as problematic and suggests that they were more likely a unique type of organism that had a "quilted" construction. Another view supported by Grazhdankin and Gerdes is that they were possibly a type of microbial colony.

Footnotes 

Ediacaran life
Fossils of Australia
Fossils of Canada
Fossils of Norway